Ramzi Nafi or Ramzi Nafi Rashid Agha (1917–1949) was a Kurdish nationalist who assisted the Nazi German Wehrmacht in a failed operation against the British rule in Iraq in 1943, during World War II, in exchange for the Nazis helping him creating an independent Kurdistan. It is a subject of debate on whether Ramzi was ideologically a Nazi or not. Collaboration with the Nazis might have been a way for Ramzi to pursue his ideology. As one of the most controversial figures in recent Kurdish history, his involvement in the failed Operation Mammoth has earned him a high reputation in Kurdistan.

Life

Youth 
Ramzi was born in 1917 to a prominent family from Erbil. He attended primary school and secondary school in Erbil. At the time there were no high schools in Erbil, so as a result he went to a high school in Kirkuk for a year. In Kirkuk, Ramzi joined the far-right Hîwa party led by Rafiq Hilmi. Ramzi then attended a science-oriented high school in Baghdad in the years of 1937 and 1938. He passed the Bachelor's degree exam in Baghdad and in 1939 he decided to leave for Beirut. He attends the American University of Beirut for two years and achieves the rank of "Freshman". He was known for his opposition to the British putting Kurdish lands within Iraqi borders. In Beirut, he met with Kamuran Alî Bedirxan, Nûredin Zaza and some active figures in the Xoybûn at that time, and joined the Kurdish nationalist Xoybûn Party, which strived for an independent Kurdish state.  He remained in Beirut from October 1941 to March 1942. Later, he goes to Istanbul to complete his education and is accepted in the private Robert College. It was in Istanbul in mid-1942 where he was contacted by the Abwehr and Major Gottfried Müller's men for Operation Mammoth.

Operation Mammoth (Mammut) 
Operation Mammoth was a German special forces mission in 1943 during World War II, led by Major Gottfried Müller and accompanied by Ramzi Nafi, to incite a rebellion of Iraqi Kurds in an attempt to expel the British from the region, gain control of the oil fields, and somehow deliver them to the Wehrmacht because Operation Barbarossa was not progressing as it was expected in reaching the Caucasus. In return for ejecting the British, the Kurds would be assisted by the Nazis in creating an independent Kurdistan. The mastermind of the operation, Major Gottfried Müller, needed "a native Kurd who would be prepared to jump with us, lead us to a good hiding place and then make contact for us with Sheikh Mahmud and other Kurdish chieftains." Shortly after his arrival in Istanbul in 1942, Ramzi Nafi was contacted by several members of the Sicherheitsdienst unit and Müller's men to discuss the possibility of creating a roadmap-like plan for Kurdish unification in exchange for Kurdish uprisings against the British occupying the Kirkuk oil fields.

Failure 

The mission failed on the first day. The weapon and equipment cases were lost in the parachute drop and the group landed 300 km from the intended target. Ramzi and the Germans operatives were taken prisoners by British and Iraqi forces, tortured and given the death sentence. Gottfried Müller managed to escape and return to Germany where he lived until his death on 26 September 2009. Ramzi had his sentence reduced to life imprisonment, however he became mentally insane in prison and was released from prison in 1947. Ramzi died two years later in 1949 in his hometown Erbil in Iraqi Kurdistan.

The Kirkuk-Haifa Pipeline, which from 1935 routed Iraqi oil to refineries near the Mediterranean city of Haifa and which Time Magazine on April 21, 1941, described as the "jugular of the British Empire" as well as the Kirkuk-Tripoli pipeline branching off at Haditha, formed the backbone of the Western Allies' warfare in the Mediterranean, and their loss would have had a decisive impact on the further course of the war.

Biographies 

 Ramzi Nafi’, der große Märtyrer, den die Stadt Hawler opferte. Mas’ud Mohamad 1985.

Operation Mammoth 

 Werner Brockdorff: Geheimkommandos des Zweiten Weltkrieges. Wels 1967, .
 Ulrich van der Heyden, Bernd Lemke, Pherset Rosbeiani: Unternehmen Mammut: Ein Kommandoeinsatz der Wehrmacht in Nordirak 1943. Edition Falkenberg, .

See also 

 Celadet Ali Bedirxan
 Kamuran Bedirxan
 Mehmet Şükrü Sekban
 Rafiq Hilmi

External links 

 https://edoc.hu-berlin.de/bitstream/handle/18452/17192/rosbeiani.pdf?sequence=1&isAllowed=y (PDF)
 http://www.lemkegeschichte.de/index_htm_files/Lemke%20Unternehmen%20Mammut%201943.pdf (PDF)

1917 births
1949 deaths
Kurdish people